Jackson Township is a township in Lyon County, Kansas, United States.

History
Jackson Township was originally called Forest Hill Township, and under the latter name was formed in 1859. It was renamed Jackson Township in 1860.

References

Townships in Lyon County, Kansas
Townships in Kansas